The Seoul Olympic Cyclodrome is a velodrome located at the Olympic Park in Seoul, South Korea. It hosted the track cycling events of the 1988 Summer Olympics. It was constructed from September 1984 to April 1986 and has a seating capacity of 6,000.

References
1988 Summer Olympics official report. Volume 1. Part 1. p. 176.

Velodromes in South Korea
Cycle racing in South Korea
Sports venues in Seoul
Venues of the 1988 Summer Olympics
Olympic cycling venues
Sports venues completed in 1986
Olympic Park, Seoul
Venues of the 1986 Asian Games
Asian Games cycling venues